The 2012–13 Golden State Warriors season was the 67th season of the franchise in the National Basketball Association (NBA), and the 51st anniversary of their time in the San Francisco Bay Area.

The team finished with a record of 47–35 (.573), and finished the season as the number-six seed, clinching a playoff berth for the first time since 2007. The team had a winning record for the first time since 2008. This season included the first playoff series victory for the first time since 2007, as most of the squad experienced postseason play for the first time. The season began a streak of 7 straight winning records.

The Warriors had four draft picks in the 2012 NBA Draft, a decisive draft year that was vital for a potential future for the team. The picks included Harrison Barnes with the 7th pick, Festus Ezeli with the 30th pick, Draymond Green with the 35th pick, and Ognjen Kuzmic with the 52nd pick. With Brandon Rush and his season-ending injury, Barnes was placed in the starting lineup and became crucial in bringing the team back to the playoffs for the first time in six years. Another injury mid-season from Andrew Bogut also affected the team with the lack of a true center for a majority of the season.

Notable highlights from the season included Stephen Curry breaking the record for three-point field goals made in a single season with 272, thus eclipsing Ray Allen's then-seven-year-old record of 269 made, and Curry and Klay Thompson's rise to NBA dominance as one of the greatest three-point-shooting duos in history, coining the term "Splash Brothers" for their abilities to shoot beyond the arc in record-breaking numbers. A seven-game Eastern Conference road trip featured a 6–1 record, including a close win against the defending champion Miami Heat. David Lee was named as an All-Star in the 2013 NBA All-Star Game in Houston, and thus became the first Warrior since Latrell Sprewell in 1997 to be named an All-Star. Lee also led the league in double-doubles. The Warriors returned to the playoffs for the first time in six years; for most players the first time experiencing postseason play except Bogut. After a 4–2 series win against the number-three seed Denver Nuggets in the first round, the Warriors won a playoff series for the first time since 2007. In the Conference Semi-final, the Warriors faced the number two-seed San Antonio Spurs. Curry scored 44 points in a double-overtime loss in Game 1, but the team pulled off a 100-91 Game 2 win, which was the first Warriors victory, playoff or regular season, in San Antonio since February 1997 and did not occur again until April 10, 2016 (when the same Warriors' team also defeated the same Spurs' team handed their only loss of the 2016 season which tied the 1985–86 Boston Celtics home record for most wins at home during the regular season at 40–1), to tie the series at one game apiece. However, despite the willingness to fight, the inexperience and youth of the Warrior squad resulted in defeat as the Warriors lost to the eventual Western Conference Champion Spurs in six games.

Draft

Pre-season

|- style="background:#cfc;"
| 1
| October 7
| @ L. A. Lakers
| 
| David Lee (19)
| David Lee (7)
| Charles Jenkins (7)
| Save Mart Center12,015
| 1–0
|- style="background:#cfc;"
| 2
| October 8
| Utah
| 
| David Lee (19)
| David Lee (14)
| Stephen Curry (6)
| Oracle Arena14,571
| 2–0
|- style="background:#cfc;"
| 3
| October 11
| Maccabi Haifa
| 
| Carl Landry (24)
| Ezeli, Landry (8)
| Stephen Curry (10)
| Oracle Arena8,237
| 3–0
|- style="background:#fcc;"
| 4
| October 15
| @ Denver
| 
| Stephen Curry (25)
| Klay Thompson (6)
| Jarrett Jack (5)
| Pepsi Center11,621
| 3–1
|- style="background:#cfc;"
| 5
| October 17
| @ Sacramento
| 
| Stephen Curry (19)
| David Lee (14)
| Jarrett Jack (8)
| Power Balance Pavilion10,708
| 4–1
|- style="background:#cfc;"
| 6
| October 19
| @ Portland
| 
| David Lee (24)
| David Lee (8)
| Jarrett Jack (9)
| Rose Garden19,109
| 5–1
|- style="background:#fcc;"
| 7
| October 22
| @ L. A. Clippers
| 
| Jarrett Jack (14)
| David Lee (9)
| Jarrett Jack (5)
| Staples Center14,143
| 5–2
|- style="background:#cfc;"
| 8
| October 23
| Phoenix
| 
| Barnes, Lee (16)
| Harrison Barnes (7)
| Jarrett Jack (9)
| Oracle Arena17,427
| 6–2

Regular season

Standings

Division

Conference

Game log

|- style="background:#cfc;"
| 1 || October 31 || @ Phoenix
| 
| Carl Landry (17)
| David Lee (9)
| Jarrett Jack (7)
| US Airways Center15,678
| 1–0

|- style="background:#fcc;"
| 2 || November 2 || Memphis
| 
| Stephen Curry (26)
| David Lee (7)
| Stephen Curry (7)
| Oracle Arena19,596
| 1–1
|- style="background:#cfc;"
| 3 || November 3 || @ L. A. Clippers
| 
| Curry, Landry (23)
| David Lee (12)
| Jarrett Jack (7)
| Staples Center19,060
| 2–1
|- style="background:#fcc;"
| 4 || November 5 || @ Sacramento
| 
| Klay Thompson (22)
| Klay Thompson (7)
| Stephen Curry (8)
| Power Balance Pavilion17,317
| 2–2
|- style="background:#cfc;"
| 5 || November 7 || Cleveland
| 
| David Lee (22)
| David Lee (14)
| Stephen Curry, Lee (6)
| Oracle Arena18,124
| 3–2
|- style="background:#fcc;"
| 6 || November 9 || @ L. A. Lakers
| 
| Stephen Curry (18)
| David Lee (12)
| Stephen Curry (5)
| Staples Center18,997
| 3–3
|- style="background:#fcc;"
| 7 || November 10 || Denver
| 
| Klay Thompson (23)
| Landry, Lee (9)
| Jack, Lee (5)
| Oracle Arena19,596
| 3–4
|- style="background:#cfc;"
| 8 || November 14 || Atlanta
| 
| Harrison Barnes (19)
| Harrison Barnes (13)
| Stephen Curry (7)
| Oracle Arena18,107
| 4–4
|- style="background:#cfc;"
| 9 || November 16 || @ Minnesota
| 
| Barnes, Lee (18)
| David Lee (13)
| Stephen Curry (6)
| Target Center16,013
| 5–4
|- style="background:#fcc;"
| 10 || November 18 || @ Oklahoma City
| 
| Stephen Curry (22)
| David Lee (10)
| Stephen Curry (6)
| Chesapeake Energy Arena18,203
| 5–5
|- style="background:#cfc;"
| 11 || November 19 || @ Dallas
| 
| Stephen Curry (31)
| David Lee (19)
| Stephen Curry (9)
| American Airlines Center20,034
| 6–5
|- style="background:#cfc;"
| 12 || November 21 || Brooklyn
| 
| Stephen Curry (25)
| David Lee (13)
| Jarrett Jack (9)
| Oracle Arena18,374
| 7–5
|- style="background:#fcc;"
| 13 || November 23 || @ Denver
| 
| David Lee (21)
| Ezeli, Lee (10)
| Jack, Landry (4)
| Pepsi Center18,523
| 7–6
|- style="background:#cfc;"
| 14 || November 24 || Minnesota
| 
| Klay Thompson (24)
| Harrison Barnes (11)
| Stephen Curry (6)
| Oracle Arena19,084
| 8–6
|- style="background:#cfc;"
| 15 || November 29 || Denver
| 
| David Lee (31)
| Lee, Thompson (9)
| Stephen Curry (10)
| Oracle Arena17,627
| 9–6

|- style="background:#cfc;"
| 16 || December 1 || Indiana
| 
| Klay Thompson (22)
| David Lee (12)
| Stephen Curry (11)
| Oracle Arena18,623
| 10–6
|- style="background:#fcc;"
| 17 || December 3 || Orlando
| 
| Stephen Curry (25)
| Carl Landry (10)
| Stephen Curry (11)
| Oracle Arena18,117
| 10–7
|- style="background:#cfc;"
| 18 || December 5 || @ Detroit
| 
| Klay Thompson (27)
| David Lee (11)
| Stephen Curry (10)
| The Palace of Auburn Hills11,128
| 11–7
|- style="background:#cfc;"
| 19 || December 7 || @ Brooklyn
| 
| David Lee (30)
| David Lee (15)
| Jarrett Jack (8)
| Barclays Center17,732
| 12–7
|- style="background:#cfc;"
| 20 || December 8 || @ Washington
| 
| David Lee (24)
| David Lee (17)
| Curry, Thompson (5)
| Verizon Center15,176
| 13–7
|- style="background:#cfc;"
| 21 || December 10 || @ Charlotte
| 
| Stephen Curry (27)
| David Lee (11)
| Stephen Curry (7)
| Time Warner Cable Arena13,169
| 14–7
|- style="background:#cfc;"
| 22 || December 12 || @ Miami
| 
| Klay Thompson (27)
| David Lee (13)
| Stephen Curry (7)
| American Airlines Arena19,600
| 15–7
|- style="background:#fcc;"
| 23 || December 14 || @ Orlando
| 
| Stephen Curry (25)
| David Lee (15)
| Jarrett Jack (6)
| Amway Center17,040
| 15–8
|- style="background:#cfc;"
| 24 || December 15 || @ Atlanta
| 
| David Lee (20)
| David Lee (11)
| Stephen Curry (11)
| Philips Arena15,145
| 16–8
|- style="background:#cfc;"
| 25 || December 18 || New Orleans
| 
| David Lee (26)
| David Lee (9)
| Jarrett Jack (10)
| Oracle Arena19,596
| 17–8
|- style="background:#fcc;"
| 26 || December 19 || @ Sacramento
| 
| Stephen Curry (32)
| David Lee (8)
| Lee, Thompson (5)
| Sleep Train Arena12,885
| 17–9
|- style="background:#cfc;"
| 27 || December 21 || Charlotte
| 
| Stephen Curry (27)
| David Lee (11)
| David Lee (11)
| Oracle Arena19,596
| 18–9
|- style="background:#fcc;"
| 28 || December 22 || L. A. Lakers
| 
| Jarrett Jack (29)
| David Lee (11)
| Jarrett Jack (11)
| Oracle Arena19,596
| 18–10
|- style="background:#cfc;"
| 29 || December 26 || @ Utah
| 
| Stephen Curry (23)
| Andris Biedriņš (12)
| Stephen Curry (7)
| EnergySolutions Arena19,404
| 19–10
|- style="background:#cfc;"
| 30 || December 28 || Philadelphia
| 
| David Lee (25)
| David Lee (12)
| Curry, Jack (6)
| Oracle Arena19,596
| 20–10
|- style="background:#cfc;"
| 31 || December 29 || Boston
| 
| Stephen Curry (22)
| Harrison Barnes (8)
| Stephen Curry (9)
| Oracle Arena19,596
| 21–10

|- style="background:#cfc;"
| 32 || January 2 || L. A. Clippers
| 
| Stephen Curry (31)
| David Lee (13)
| Stephen Curry (8)
| Oracle Arena19,596
| 22–10
|- style="background:#fcc;"
| 33 || January 5 || @ L. A. Clippers
| 
| Klay Thompson (14)
| Draymond Green (8)
| Stephen Curry (5)
| Staples Center19,323
| 22–11
|- style="background:#fcc;"
| 34 || January 9 || Memphis
| 
| Stephen Curry (24)
| David Lee (10)
| Klay Thompson (7)
| Oracle Arena19,596
| 22–12
|- style="background:#cfc;"
| 35 || January 11 || Portland
| 
| David Lee (24)
| David Lee (10)
| Stephen Curry (12)
| Oracle Arena19,596
| 23–12
|- style="background:#fcc;"
| 36 || January 13 || @ Denver
| 
| Stephen Curry (29)
| David Lee (13)
| Jarrett Jack (8)
| Pepsi Center15,861
| 23–13
|- style="background:#fcc;"
| 37 || January 16 || Miami
| 
| Jarrett Jack (16)
| David Lee (11)
| Kent Bazemore (5)
| Oracle Arena19,596
| 23–14
|- style="background:#fcc;"
| 38 || January 18 || @ San Antonio
| 
| David Lee (22)
| Harrison Barnes (8)
| Jarrett Jack (10)
| AT&T Center18,581
| 23–15
|- style="background:#cfc;"
| 39 || January 19 || @ New Orleans
| 
| Klay Thompson (29)
| Carl Landry (11)
| Jarrett Jack (12)
| New Orleans Arena15,472
| 24–15
|- style="background:#cfc;"
| 40 || January 21 || L. A. Clippers
| 
| Stephen Curry (28)
| David Lee (11)
| Jarrett Jack (10)
| Oracle Arena19,596
| 25–15
|- style="background:#cfc;"
| 41 || January 23 || Oklahoma City
| 
| Stephen Curry (31)
| David Lee (12)
| Jarrett Jack (8)
| Oracle Arena19,596
| 26–15
|- style="background:#fcc;"
| 42 || January 25 || @ Chicago
| 
| David Lee (23)
| Klay Thompson (8)
| Jarrett Jack (5)
| United Center21,756
| 26–16
|- style="background:#fcc;"
| 43 || January 26 || @ Milwaukee
| 
| Stephen Curry (26)
| David Lee (15)
| Jarrett Jack (10)
| BMO Harris Bradley Center16,937
| 26–17
|- style="background:#cfc;"
| 44 || January 28 || @ Toronto
| 
| David Lee (21)
| David Lee (12)
| David Lee (7)
| Air Canada Centre15,914
| 27–17
|- style="background:#cfc;"
| 45 || January 29 || @ Cleveland
| 
| Klay Thompson (32)
| David Lee (13)
| Jarrett Jack (12)
| Quicken Loans Arena13,939
| 28–17
|- style="background:#cfc;"
| 46 || January 31 || Dallas
| 
| Klay Thompson (27)
| David Lee (20)
| Jack, Lee (9)
| Oracle Arena19,596
| 29–17

|- style="background:#cfc;"
| 47 || February 2 || Phoenix
| 
| Stephen Curry (29)
| David Lee (12)
| Stephen Curry (8)
| Oracle Arena19,596
| 30–17
|- style="background:#fcc;"
| 48 || February 5 || @ Houston
| 
| Jarrett Jack (20)
| Andrew Bogut (9)
| Stephen Curry (9)
| Toyota Center15,453
| 30–18
|- style="background:#fcc;"
| 49 || February 6 || @ Oklahoma City
| 
| Barnes, Thompson (19)
| David Lee (11)
| Stephen Curry (11)
| Chesapeake Energy Arena18,203
| 30–19
|- style="background:#fcc;"
| 50 || February 8 || @ Memphis
| 
| Stephen Curry (32)
| Harrison Barnes (7)
| Stephen Curry (8)
| FedExForum16,701
| 30–20
|- style="background:#fcc;"
| 51 || February 9 || @ Dallas
| 
| Stephen Curry (18)
| Draymond Green (9)
| Stephen Curry (4)
| American Airlines Center20,355
| 30–21
|- style="background:#fcc;"
| 52 || February 12 || Houston
| 
| Stephen Curry (27)
| Bogut, Lee (12)
| Stephen Curry (6)
| Oracle Arena19,596
| 30–22
|- align="center"
|colspan="9" bgcolor="#bbcaff"|All-Star Break
|- style="background:#fcc;"
| 53 || February 19 || @ Utah
| 
| Stephen Curry (29)
| David Lee (9)
| Jarrett Jack (9)
| EnergySolutions Arena18,231
| 30–23
|- style="background:#cfc;"
| 54 || February 20 || Phoenix
| 
| Klay Thompson (28)
| Bogut, Lee (11)
| Stephen Curry (11)
| Oracle Arena19,596
| 31–23
|- style="background:#cfc;"
| 55 || February 22 || San Antonio
| 
| Jarrett Jack (30)
| David Lee (22)
| Jarrett Jack (10)
| Oracle Arena19,596
| 32–23
|- style="background:#cfc;"
| 56 || February 24 || @ Minnesota
| 
| Jarrett Jack (23)
| David Lee (13)
| Jarrett Jack (8)
| Target Center18,033
| 33–23
|- style="background:#fcc;"
| 57 || February 26 || @ Indiana
| 
| Stephen Curry (38)
| David Lee (12)
| Curry, Jack (4)
| Bankers Life Fieldhouse14,426
| 33–24
|- style="background:#fcc;"
| 58 || February 27 || @ New York
| 
| Stephen Curry (54)
| Stephen Curry (6)
| Stephen Curry (7)
| Madison Square Garden19,033
| 33–25

|- style="background:#fcc;"
| 59 || March 1 || @ Boston
| 
| Stephen Curry (25)
| David Lee (19)
| Stephen Curry (6)
| TD Garden18,624
| 33–26
|- style="background:#fcc;"
| 60 || March 2 || @ Philadelphia
| 
| Stephen Curry (30)
| David Lee (16)
| Stephen Curry (8)
| Wells Fargo Center17,929
| 33–27
|- style="background:#cfc;"
| 61 || March 4 || Toronto
| 
| David Lee (29)
| David Lee (11)
| Stephen Curry (12)
| Oracle Arena19,596
| 34–27
|- style="background:#cfc;"
| 62 || March 6 || Sacramento
| 
| Klay Thompson (20)
| David Lee (10)
| Stephen Curry (8)
| Oracle Arena19,596
| 35–27
|- style="background:#fcc;"
| 63 || March 8 || Houston
| 
| Stephen Curry (24)
| Andrew Bogut (11)
| Stephen Curry (8)
| Oracle Arena19,596
| 35–28
|- style="background:#fcc;"
| 64 || March 9 || Milwaukee
| 
| Carl Landry (18)
| Carl Landry (10)
| Stephen Curry (10)
| Oracle Arena19,596
| 35–29
|- style="background:#cfc;"
| 65 || March 11 || New York
| 
| Stephen Curry (26)
| Andrew Bogut (11)
| David Lee (8)
| Oracle Arena19,596
| 36–29
|- style="background:#cfc;"
| 66 || March 13 || Detroit
| 
| Stephen Curry (31)
| David Lee (15)
| Stephen Curry (8)
| Oracle Arena19,596
| 37–29
|- style="background:#fcc;"
| 67 || March 15 || Chicago
| 
| Jarrett Jack (20)
| David Lee (8)
| Stephen Curry (4)
| Oracle Arena19,596
| 37–30
|- style="background:#cfc;"
| 68 || March 17 || @ Houston
| 
| Stephen Curry (29)
| Andrew Bogut (12)
| Stephen Curry (11)
| Toyota Center18,219
| 38–30
|- style="background:#cfc;"
| 69 || March 18 || @ New Orleans
| 
| Stephen Curry (30)
| David Lee (11)
| Bogut, Jack (5)
| New Orleans Arena11,844
| 39–30
|- style="background:#fcc;"
| 70 || March 20 || @ San Antonio
| 
| Stephen Curry (24)
| David Lee (12)
| Jarrett Jack (7)
| AT&T Center17,751
| 39–31
|- style="background:#cfc;"
| 71 || March 23 || Washington
| 
| Stephen Curry (35)
| David Lee (15)
| Stephen Curry (8)
| Oracle Arena19,596
| 40–31
|- style="background:#cfc;"
| 72 || March 25 || L. A. Lakers
| 
| Stephen Curry (25)
| David Lee (12)
| Stephen Curry (10)
| Oracle Arena19,596
| 41–31
|- style="background:#fcc;"
| 73 || March 27 || Sacramento
| 
| David Lee (20)
| David Lee (10)
| Stephen Curry (12)
| Oracle Arena19,596
| 41–32
|- style="background:#cfc;"
| 74 || March 30 || Portland
| 
| Stephen Curry (39)
| Carl Landry (10)
| Curry, Jack (6)
| Oracle Arena19,596
| 42–32

|- style="background:#cfc;"
| 75 || April 3 || New Orleans
| 
| David Lee (23)
| David Lee (16)
| Stephen Curry (9)
| Oracle Arena19,596
| 43–32
|- style="background:#cfc;"
| 76 || April 5 || @ Phoenix
|
| Klay Thompson (25)
| David Lee (14)
| Stephen Curry (15)
| US Airways Center18,422
| 44–32
|- style="background:#fcc;"
| 77 || April 7 || Utah
| 
| Stephen Curry (22)
| David Lee (13)
| Jarrett Jack (6)
| Oracle Arena19,596
| 44–33
|- style="background:#cfc;"
| 78 || April 9 || Minnesota
| 
| Klay Thompson (30)
| Andrew Bogut (14)
| Stephen Curry (10)
| Oracle Arena19,596
| 45–33
|- style="background:#fcc;"
| 79 || April 11 || Oklahoma City
| 
| Stephen Curry (22)
| David Lee (11)
| Stephen Curry (7)
| Oracle Arena19,596
| 45–34
|- style="background:#fcc;"
| 80 || April 12 || @ L. A. Lakers
| 
| Stephen Curry (47)
| David Lee (8)
| Stephen Curry (9)
| Staples Center18,997
| 45–35
|- style="background:#cfc;"
| 81 || April 15 || San Antonio
| 
| Stephen Curry (35)
| Festus Ezeli (13)
| Jarrett Jack (12)
| Oracle Arena19,596
| 46–35
|- style="background:#cfc;"
| 82 || April 17 || @ Portland
| 
| Klay Thompson (24)
| Barnes, Lee (10)
| Curry, Jack (5)
| Rose Garden20,261
| 47–35

Playoffs

Game log

|- style="background:#fcc;"
| 1 || April 20 || @ Denver
| 
| Klay Thompson (28)
| David Lee (13)
| Jarrett Jack (5)
| Pepsi Center19,155
| 0–1
|- style="background:#cfc;"
| 2 || April 23 || @ Denver
| 
| Stephen Curry (30)
| Andrew Bogut (8)
| Stephen Curry (13)
| Pepsi Center19,155
| 1–1
|- style="background:#cfc;"
| 3 || April 26 || Denver
| 
| Stephen Curry (29)
| Andrew Bogut (9)
| Stephen Curry (11)
| Oracle Arena19,596
| 2–1
|- style="background:#cfc;"
| 4 || April 28 || Denver
| 
| Stephen Curry (31)
| Draymond Green (6)
| Jarrett Jack (9)
| Oracle Arena19,596
| 3–1
|- style="background:#fcc;"
| 5 || April 30 || @ Denver
| 
| Harrison Barnes (23)
| Harrison Barnes (9)
| Stephen Curry (8)
| Pepsi Center19,155
| 3–2
|- style="background:#cfc;"
| 6 || May 2 || Denver
| 
| Stephen Curry (22)
| Andrew Bogut (21)
| Stephen Curry (8)
| Oracle Arena19,596
| 4–2

|- style="background:#fcc;"
| 1 || May 6 || @ San Antonio
| 
| Stephen Curry (44)
| Andrew Bogut (15)
| Stephen Curry (11)
| AT&T Center18,581
| 0–1
|- style="background:#cfc;"
| 2 || May 8 || @ San Antonio
| 
| Klay Thompson (34)
| Klay Thompson (14)
| Draymond Green (5)
| AT&T Center18,581
| 1–1
|- style="background:#fcc;"
| 3 || May 10 || San Antonio
| 
| Klay Thompson (17)
| Andrew Bogut (12)
| Stephen Curry (8)
| Oracle Arena19,596
| 1–2
|- style="background:#cfc;"
| 4 || May 12 || San Antonio
| 
| Harrison Barnes (26)
| Andrew Bogut (18)
| 3 players tied (4)
| Oracle Arena19,596
| 2–2
|- style="background:#fcc;"
| 5 || May 14 || @ San Antonio
| 
| Harrison Barnes (25)
| Harrison Barnes (7)
| Stephen Curry (8)
| AT&T Center18,581
| 2–3
|- style="background:#fcc;"
| 6 || May 16 || San Antonio
| 
| Stephen Curry (22)
| Bogut, Ezeli (7)
| Stephen Curry (6)
| Oracle Arena19,596
| 2–4

Roster

Transactions

Trades

Free agency

Re-signed

Additions

Subtractions

References

Golden State Warriors seasons
Golden State Warriors
Golden
Golden